The Canadian Psychological Association (CPA) is the primary organization representing psychologists throughout Canada.  It was organized in 1939 and incorporated under the Canada Corporations Act, Part II, in May 1950.

Its objectives are to improve the health and welfare of all Canadians; to promote excellence and innovation in psychological research, education, and practice; to promote the advancement, development, dissemination, and application of psychological knowledge; and to provide high-quality services to members.

History
The CPA was founded in a University of Ottawa psychology lab in 1938, although it was not formally organized until 1939. Initially, the CPA's purpose was to help with Canada's contribution to World War II; indeed, the CPA was heavily involved with test construction for the Department of National Defence.

Organizational structure
CPA's head office is located in Ottawa, Ontario.
The CPA has a directorate for each of its three pillars – science, practice, and education.
The Science Directorate's mandate is to lobby government for increased funding for psychological research, promote and support the work of Canadian researchers in psychology, and educate the public about important findings from psychological science.
The Practice Directorate's mandate is to support and facilitate advocacy for the practice of psychology across Canada.
The Education Directorate's mandate is to oversee the accreditation of doctoral and internship programmes in professional psychology.
The Board of Directors sets policies that guide the CPA. It is made up of Presidential Officers, Directors, and Executive Officers.

Publications
The CPA, in partnership with the American Psychological Association, quarterly publishes the following three academic journals:
Canadian Journal of Behavioural Science
Canadian Journal of Experimental Psychology
Canadian Psychology
The CPA also publishes a quarterly magazine called Psynopsis. Issues contain brief articles on specific themes relating to psychology, as well as updates from the head office of CPA, committee news, information about the annual convention, and much more.

Mind Pad is a professional newsletter that is written and reviewed by student affiliates of the Canadian Psychological Association. The newsletter is published biannually online.

Awards
Each year at the annual convention, CPA honors individuals who have made distinguished contributions to psychology in Canada with the following awards:
CPA Gold Medal Award For Distinguished Lifetime Contributions to Canadian Psychology
CPA John C. Service Member the Year Award
CPA Donald O. Hebb Award for Distinguished Contributions to Psychology as a Science
CPA Award for Distinguished Contributions to Education and Training in Psychology
CPA Award for Distinguished Contributions to Psychology as a Profession
CPA Award for Distinguished Contributions to the International Advancement of Psychology 
CPA Award for Distinguished Contributions to Public or Community Service
Distinguished Practitioner Award
CPA Award for Distinguished Lifetime Service to the Canadian Psychological Association
CPA Humanitarian Award
President's New Researcher Award
The CPA has numerous student awards. As an example, the CPA gives out Certificates of Academic Excellence to students in each Canadian psychology department for the best undergraduate, masters, and doctoral thesis. The sections of CPA also award students for exceptional papers, presentations, and posters at the annual convention.

Fellowships are awarded to members of the CPA who have made distinguished contributions to the advancement of the science or profession of psychology or who have given exceptional service to their national or provincial associations. The Committee on Fellows and Awards review nominations and make recommendations to the Board of Directors who appoint fellows.

Presidents
The following have been Presidents of the Association:

See also
American Psychological Association

References

External links
 Official website
 Archival papers held at University of Toronto Archives and Records Management Services
 Psychology training programs in Canada

 
Scientific organizations based in Canada
Psychology organizations based in Canada
Scientific organizations established in 1939